Marija Uzelac, (Serbian Cyrillic: Марија Узелац; born February 22, 1958, in Kula, SFR Yugoslavia) is a former Yugoslav and Serbian basketball player.

External links
Profile at sports-reference.com

1958 births
Living people
People from Kula, Serbia
Serbian women's basketball players
Yugoslav women's basketball players
Centers (basketball)
Olympic basketball players of Yugoslavia
Basketball players at the 1984 Summer Olympics